Unincorporated  is a 2001 studio album by Earl Harvin Trio. The album includes a variety of styles extending beyond jazz "layering rhythmic textures and harmonic nuance".

Musicians 
 Earl Harvin – drums, electric bass, Wurlitzer
 Dave Palmer – Rhodes, Wurlitzer, piano, samples
 Fred Hamilton – bass, guitar, banjo, Hindustani slide guitar

Track listing 
 "Manitou Inclined"
 "Sun City"
 "Improv 1"
 "Osiris"
 "Mr. Natural"
 "Improv 2"
 "Debashish"
 "Blue Fred"
 "Lily"
 "Improv 3"

References 

Jazz albums by American artists
2001 albums